National Welsh Omnibus Services was a bus company which operated in south-east Wales and in the Forest of Dean area of Gloucestershire from 1978 to 1992.  It used the trading name National Welsh and its Welsh equivalent Cymru Cenedlaethol.

History 
 
National Welsh had its origins in the Western Welsh Omnibus Company, formed in 1929 as a subsidiary of British Electric Traction.  The Great Western Railway transferred its bus services in South and West Wales to the company and took a financial interest, hence the name.  The railway interest passed to the British Transport Commission in 1948, but Western Welsh was not fully nationalised until 1967 when BET sold its bus interests to the Transport Holding Company.  The company passed to the National Bus Company in 1969.

In 1970 and 1971, the NBC transferred Western Welsh's operations west of Bridgend to its subsidiaries South Wales Transport and Crosville.  In return Western Welsh took over the operations of Rhondda Transport.

On 17 April 1978, the National Bus Company transferred the operations of its subsidiary Red & White Services to Western Welsh and renamed the merged company National Welsh/Cymru Cenedlaethol (the latter an incorrect translation, which should be Cymraeg Cenedlaethol).  The company's area of operations thus became South-East Wales and the Forest of Dean area of Gloucestershire.

In 1987, National Welsh was sold to its management, which struggled to make a profit.  In January 1991, the Eastern Division of National Welsh, which included depots in Cwmbran, Crosskeys, Brynmawr and Chepstow, was sold to Western Travel Group.  Western Travel renamed this division (with its outstations at Abergavenny, Brecon, Cinderford, Ross and Lydney), Red & White Services Ltd.  The Company traded as Red & White and introduced a livery similar to National Welsh, but with a grey band instead of green.

Bustler
From 1986 to 1992, Bustler was the registered service name and brand used by National Welsh for a large fleet of minibuses in a chrome yellow livery, featuring blue, red and white stripes. Its key marker was the use of the stripes like wedding ribbons on the front bonnet. The van chassis were initially Iveco Daily, Freight Rover Sherpa and Ford Transits with conversions by Dormobile and Carlyle. Whilst comfort was not their strong point, the five- to ten-minute frequencies transformed patronage levels in the towns of Aberdare, Barry, Bridgend, Cwmbran, Ebbw Vale, Penarth, Pontypridd, Porth, and Tredegar. They were even seen in Newport and Cardiff. Five blue Bustlers were introduced in Pontypridd when the council run Taff-Ely (previously Pontypridd Urban District Council) operations were taken over. Bustlers also covered much of the Rhymney Valley when Inter-Valley Link Ltd (former Caerphilly UDC, Gelligaer UDC, and Bedwas & Machen UDC) operations went into receivership.

Bustlers also entered Merthyr Tydfil in a big way causing a financial crisis for MTT, the privatised council bus service. All the Merthyr Tydfil Transport bus drivers resigned en masse and joined National Welsh as a block Bustler team. With minibuses being a cheaper form of bus operation, Bustlers were seen on tendered services in places like Monmouth and on two routes in Bristol for a time.

The minibus catered for a commercial need at the time when many other privatised bus companies saw it as a way of maintaining market dominance and giving something the public wanted - a high frequency service without the need to consult a timetable. Problems occurred as passenger demand outstripped supply on a number of routes, and many of the vehicles did not last their pay-back period. None of the 500 odd Bustlers minibuses allowed wheelchair access and their nickname, by their detractors, summed them up as "bread vans with seats". However, in their yellow livery, the slogan of the time ran true - "Bustler - the brighter way to travel".

The Bustler name (in a different typeface style) was also used by a former London Country Bus Services operation following privatisation, but the company agreed to remove the name within two years at the formal insistence of National Welsh.

The Bustler name is now used for a paratransit service in Woking.

Insolvency and subsequent history 
In early 1992 National Welsh, now without its Eastern Division, was placed into receivership - the main example of a failed bus privatisation.  Upon the appointment of the Receivers, there was a widespread registration of nearly all National Welsh's routes, and this could have been a contributing factor for a buyer not being found for the business. Subsequently, the company's depots were closed or sold:
The routes of Bridgend and Tredegar depots were already being operated by Red & White and South Wales Transport, and they were closed.
Merthyr depot was sold to a new company, Offa Demo, owned by Cynon Valley Transport, which later took over Aberdare as well. These two depots were immediately closed and sold for property development.
Porth and Aberdare depots were sold to a new company, Rhondda Buses Ltd, and Aberdare was quickly sold on to Offa Demo. Rhondda Buses was created from a consortium of Stevensons of Uttoxeter, Julian Peddle, British Bus, Potteries Motor Traction and later Western Travel, owners of Red & White. At one time, Rhondda Buses was unique in being owned by the three big transport groups in the UK, due to later takeovers. Badgerline, which became part of FirstGroup, took over Potteries; Stagecoach Group purchased Western Travel; and British Bus was taken over by the Cowie Group in 1996, which later became Arriva. In December 1997, the entire company was taken over by Stagecoach, despite a rival bid from First. 
Barry depot held its own in the Vale of Glamorgan, despite fierce competition from Cardiff Bus, but with Cardiff Bus running commercial services against National Welsh's tendered services, South Glamorgan County Council was legally obliged to remove any subsidy to National Welsh.  A new operator's licence was granted to Barry Line Bus Co Ltd t/a Barry Line/Bustler, and an employee bid was launched for Barry depot.  This was unsuccessful and the last remaining depot of National Welsh closed in June 1992, some 5 months after the closure of the other depots.

On the demise of National Welsh, the name Bustler quickly vanished from the roads of South Wales.

Stagecoach subsequently split the operations:  the Welsh operations became part of Stagecoach in South Wales, and the Forest of Dean operations became Stagecoach in Wye and Dean, part of Stagecoach West.

References

External links
History of National Welsh

Former bus operators in Wales